Miguel Ortega (1908 – 3 December 1996) was a Mexican modern pentathlete. He competed at the 1932 Summer Olympics.

References

1908 births
1996 deaths
Mexican male modern pentathletes
Olympic modern pentathletes of Mexico
Modern pentathletes at the 1932 Summer Olympics
Sportspeople from Mexico City
20th-century Mexican people